The 1975–76 season was the 30th season in Rijeka’s history and their 14th season in the Yugoslav First League. Their 14th place finish in the 1974–75 season meant it was their second successive season playing in the Yugoslav First League.

Competitions

Yugoslav First League

Classification

Results summary

Results by round

Matches

First League

Source: rsssf.com

Yugoslav Cup

Source: rsssf.com

Squad statistics
Competitive matches only.

See also
1975–76 Yugoslav First League
1975–76 Yugoslav Cup

References

External sources
 1975–76 Yugoslav First League at rsssf.com
 Prvenstvo 1975.-76. at nk-rijeka.hr

HNK Rijeka seasons
Rijeka